Tomb KV9 in Egypt's Valley of the Kings was originally constructed by Pharaoh Ramesses V. He was interred here, but his uncle, Ramesses VI, later reused the tomb as his own. The layout is typical of the 20th Dynasty – the  Ramesside period – and is much simpler than that of Ramesses III's tomb (KV11).
The workmen accidentally broke into KV12 as they dug one of the corridors. In 2020, the Egyptian Tourism Authority released a full 3D model of the tomb with detailed photography, available online.

Decoration 
The tomb has some of the most diverse decoration in the Valley of the Kings. Its layout consists of a long corridor, divided by pilasters into several sections, leading to a pillared hall, from which a second long corridor descends to the burial chamber. The digging of the burial chamber was not fully completed; its back wall has two pillars which are still connected to the wall behind them instead of standing separate.

Entrance 
The entrance is decorated with a disk containing a scarab and an image of the ram-headed Ra between Isis and Nephthys who are kneeling. The jambs and thicknesses, mentions the name of Ramesses VI. The jambs are usurped from Ramesses V.

First corridor 
On both sides are images of Ramesses VI before Ra-Horakhty and Osiris. The scenes originally depicted Ramesses V but were usurped. On the south wall of the corridor are scenes from the Book of Gates, while the north wall is decorated with scenes from the Book of Caverns. The ceilings are decorated with astronomical figures and constellations in the first few divisions of the corridor, while in the last two divisions, and continuing into the first hall, is a double presentation of both the Book of the Day and the Book of the Night, framed by an elongated image of the goddess Nut.

Hall 
The corridor ends in a pillared hall. On the left (south) wall the Book of Gates is continued. The decorations show divisions 10 and 11 including Nun holding up the bark of Ra with Nut above the scene. On the right side of the hall (the north) the Book of Caverns scenes continue. Above the entrance to the next corridor the king is shown censing and libating before Osiris. Ramesses VI is shown in a variety of scenes before gods and goddesses such as Meretseger, Khonsu, Ptah and Ptah-Sokar-Osiris. As previously mentioned, the ceiling of the hall is decorated with the remainder of the Book of the Day and the Book of the Night, framed by an elongated image of the goddess Nut. The ramp descending to the next corridor is flanked on either side by two images of winged cobras with crowns, representing the goddesses of Upper and Lower Egypt.

Second corridor 
In the descent to the second corridor the decorations show scenes from the Book of the Amduat. The ceiling depicts the barks of Ra and the Books of the Day and Night. Ramesses VI is shown before Hekau, and Maat.

Antechamber and burial chamber 
The antechamber at the end of the corridor, preceding the burial chamber, contains scenes from the Book of the Dead. The walls of the burial chamber are decorated with the Book of the Earth (or Book of Aker). These include images of a solar boat with the double-headed god Aker, images of Osiris and various gods, the destruction of enemies, and representations of the sun's rays resurrecting various figures. The vaulted ceiling of the chamber is decorated, once again, with the Book of the Day and the Book of the Night, framed by a double elongated image of Nut.

Later history 
In the Graeco-Roman period, the tomb was identified as that of Memnon, the mythological king of the Ethiopians who fought in the Trojan War. As a result, it was frequently visited; 995 graffiti left by visitors have been found on the temple walls, ranging from the 1st century BC to the 4th century AD. They were left by pilgrims, mostly Greeks, who in the Ptolemaic and Roman periods traveled to the site from different parts of Egypt and the Mediterranean. The inscriptions were written in black or, less frequently, red ink, mainly in Greek but also in Latin, Demotic, and Coptic. They appear in different parts of the tomb, usually on the upper parts of the walls, which corresponds to the higher floor level (the corridors were partly filled in at that time).

The graffiti have been studied since 1996 by the Epigraphical Mission from the Polish Centre of Mediterranean Archaeology University of Warsaw in cooperation with the Egyptian Ministry of Antiquities. Visitors' names form the majority of the graffiti, but there are also longer texts which provide more information about their authors, including their occupation. They tell us that philosophers, doctors, and high-ranking officials were among the pilgrims. Some of the texts are of a religious character (proskynema). One graffito attests that visitors had to explore the dark tunnels and painted images by torchlight, making a pun on the visitor's name, Dadouchios and the :

Other graffiti include "I visited and I did not like anything except the sarcophagus!", "I admired!" and "I cannot read the hieroglyphs!". The latest identifiable person to have visited the tomb and left a graffito may have been Amr ibn al-As, the Muslim conqueror of Roman Egypt during the Arab–Byzantine wars, if he is the person named as "Ambros" in one of them.

References

Literature 
 Reeves, N & Wilkinson, R.H. The Complete Valley of the Kings, 1996, Thames and Hudson, London.
 Siliotti, A. Guide to the Valley of the Kings and to the Theban Necropolises and Temples, 1996, A.A. Gaddis, Cairo.
 Łukaszewicz, A., with appendix by Małkowski, W., Bogacki, M., Kaniszewski, J. Polish Epigraphical Mission in the Tomb of Ramesses VI (Kv 9) in the Valley of the Kings in 2010; Appendix: Three-dimensional spatial information system for the graffiti inside the Tomb of Ramesses VI (KV 9) in the Valley of the Kings, Polish Archaeology in the Mediterranean, 22 (2013)

External links 

 Theban Mapping Project: KV9 - Includes description, images and plans of the tomb.
 Virtual exploration of KV9
 Views of KV9 & KV12

Buildings and structures completed in the 12th century BC
Valley of the Kings
Ramesses V
Ramesses VI